Colony Wars: Red Sun (called Colony Wars III: Red Sun in North America) is a space combat simulator video game for the PlayStation developed by Psygnosis and published by Sony Computer Entertainment Europe and Midway Games in 2000. It is a sequel to Colony Wars in 1997 and Colony Wars: Vengeance in 1998. Instead of being a starfighter pilot for the League of Free Worlds or the Colonial Navy, the player now assumes the role of a civilian miner-turned-mercenary.

The game was originally set for release in North America by Psygnosis in April 2000, before it was delayed twice, once to late April or early May, and then to June 1 after being picked up by Midway Games.

Gameplay

Players can choose to engage in a variety of space and atmospheric combat missions using one of nine spacecraft. Each starfighter carries a certain combination of weapons. The player earns money for killing enemy targets or completing missions, which vary from simple intercepts to escort duties. The money earned can be used to buy more advanced spacecraft and weapons. Although the spacecraft have a certain combination of weapons, the game introduces an upgrade system where players can insert new weapons and parts into a number of predetermined slots on the vehicle. However, there are limitations: the player cannot install more than three of the same kind of laser. These parts can include scatter guns, subspace dampeners, and drones of various purposes. The velocity sight used in Vengeance also returns.

When fighting any large space vessels, the player is now given a chance to target individual parts of the ship, such as gun turrets.

Compared to the more linear structure of the first two games, Red Sun incorporates a more 'open world' structure with increased role playing elements. Since the player is a mercenary, a number of missions are arrayed in the Status Menu for the player to choose from, but only those marked with the letter P must be finished to advance the plot of the game. Engaging in non-story critical missions allows the player to earn money and purchase ships and weapon upgrades to help progression through the main campaign.

Premise
The game is set around the time frame of Vengeance. A miner in the Dendray system named Alexander Lyron Valdemar experiences strange dreams about an alien race called the Sha'Har and a mysterious ship called the Red Sun. A man known as the General forces him to get on the case of investigating the Red Sun and how it is tied to the survival of the galaxy.

Reception

The game received favorable reviews according to the review aggregation website GameRankings. Noah Massey of NextGen said of the game's European version (while the U.S. version was still in development), "If you've ever dreamed about fighting in an epic space battle, then this is without a doubt the game for you." Many other reviewers gave it favorable reviews while the game was still in development.

Notes

References

External links

2000 video games
Fiction set in the 5th millennium
Midway video games
Military science fiction video games
PlayStation (console) games
PlayStation (console)-only games
Psygnosis games
Sony Interactive Entertainment games
Space combat simulators
Video game sequels
Video games developed in the United Kingdom